The men's 4 × 400 metres relay event at the 1999 Pan American Games was held July 28–30.

Medalists

* Athletes who competed in heats only

Results

Heats
Qualification: First 3 teams of each heat (Q) plus the next 2 fastest (q) qualified for the final.

Final

References

IAAF 1999 year toplist with relay squads

Athletics at the 1999 Pan American Games
1999